Fadila Bouamr is a French-American virologist researching the molecular mechanisms that govern the assembly and egress of an infectious HIV-1 and the proteins involved in these processes. She is chief of the viral budding unit at the National Institute of Allergy and Infectious Diseases.

Education 
Fadila Bouamr earned a Ph.D. from Bordeaux Segalen University in 1997. Her dissertation was titled Caractérisation de domaines du précurseur Gag impliqués dans la morphogénèse de la particule virale de HTLV-1. Robert Mamoun was her doctoral advisor. Bouamr performed postdoctoral research with Carol Carter at the Stony Brook University and with Steve Goff at Columbia University.

Career and research 
Bouamr joined the laboratory of molecular microbiology at the National Institute of Allergy and Infectious Diseases in December 2004. She is chief of the viral budding unit. Bouamr studies the molecular mechanisms that govern the assembly and egress of an infectious HIV-1 and the proteins involved in these processes. Her unit researches the recruitment and function of cellular factors that facilitate virus separation from cells. She conducts structure-function studies of proteins and screens for new host factors involved in virus release. Bouamr studies the role of ubiquitin in virus egress and membrane scission and other cellular processes important for various steps of virus life cycle. She also studies virus assembly and trafficking to sites of virus budding.

Selected works

References 

Living people
Year of birth missing (living people)
Place of birth missing (living people)
21st-century American women scientists
French women biologists
National Institutes of Health people
University of Bordeaux alumni
Women medical researchers
HIV/AIDS researchers
American women biologists
21st-century French women scientists
21st-century American biologists
French medical researchers
American medical researchers
French emigrants to the United States
American virologists
French virologists
Women virologists